The 1907 Colorado Mines Orediggers football team was an American football team that represented the Colorado School of Mines as an independent during the 1907 college football season. The team compiled a 5–1 record, shut out four of its six opponents, and outscored all opponents by a total of 175 to 20.

Schedule

References

Colorado Mines
Colorado Mines Orediggers football seasons
Colorado Mines Orediggers football